Collops is a genus of soft-winged flower beetles in the family Melyridae. There are more than 30 described species in Collops.

Species
These 38 species belong to the genus Collops:

 Collops arizonensis Marshall
 Collops balteatus (red cross beetle)
 Collops bipunctatus (Say, 1823) (two-spotted melyrid)
 Collops blandus
 Collops cribrosus LeConte, 1852
 Collops crusoe
 Collops discretus Fall, 1912
 Collops dux Fall, 1912
 Collops eximius
 Collops flavicinctus
 Collops grandis
 Collops hirtellus LeConte, 1876
 Collops histrio
 Collops insulatus
 Collops knulli
 Collops limbellus
 Collops marginellus
 Collops marginicollis
 Collops necopinus
 Collops nigriceps (black-headed melyrid)
 Collops nigritus Schaeffer
 Collops pallipes
 Collops parvus Schaeffer
 Collops punctatus
 Collops punctulatus
 Collops quadriguttatus
 Collops quadrimaculatus (Fabricius, 1798) (four-spotted collops)
 Collops reflexus
 Collops simplex
 Collops sublimbatus Schaeffer
 Collops tibialis Schaeffer, 1912
 Collops tricolor (Say, 1823)
 Collops versatilis Fall, 1912
 Collops vicarius
 Collops vittatus (Say, 1823) (melyrid beetle)
 † Collops desuetus Wickham, 1914
 † Collops extrusus Wickham, 1914
 † Collops priscus Wickham, 1914

References

Further reading

External links

 

Melyridae
Cleroidea genera